Fenn Ranger Station is a U.S. Forest Service ranger station in the Nez Perce National Forest near Kooskia, Idaho. The ranger station serves as the headquarters of the Moose Creek Ranger District, which encompasses  of the forest. The Civilian Conservation Corps began building the ranger station in 1936 and finished the main administration building as well as two garages and two warehouses in 1937. Various other structures were added to the site in the next three years, with the last building, a barn, completed in 1940. The ranger station was added to the National Register of Historic Places on June 18, 1990.

References

Park buildings and structures on the National Register of Historic Places in Idaho
Government buildings completed in 1937
Buildings and structures in Idaho County, Idaho
United States Forest Service ranger stations
Civilian Conservation Corps in Idaho
Historic districts on the National Register of Historic Places in Idaho
National Register of Historic Places in Idaho County, Idaho
1937 establishments in Idaho